Jędrzej Gruszczyński (born 13 November 1997) is a Polish professional volleyball player. He competed for Poland at the 2019 Nations League. At the professional club level, he plays for PGE Skra Bełchatów.

Personal life
Gruszczyński has a sister Jagoda who is also a volleyball player. He graduated from SMS PZPS Spała in 2016.

Career

National team
On 12 April 2015, the Poland national team, including Gruszczyński, won a title of the U19 European Champions. They beat Italy in the final (3–1). He took part in the 2015 European Youth Olympic Festival, and on 1 August 2015 achieved a gold medal after the final match with Bulgaria (3–0). On 23 August 2015, Poland achieved its first title of the U19 World Champions. In the final his team beat hosts – Argentina (3–2).

On 2 July 2017, Poland, including Gruszczyński, achieved a title of the U21 World Champions after beating Cuba in the final (3–0). His national team won 47 matches in the row and never lost.

Honours

Youth national team
 2015  CEV U19 European Championship
 2015  FIVB U19 World Championship
 2017  FIVB U21 World Championship

References

External links

 
 Player profile at PlusLiga.pl  
 Player profile at Volleybox.net

1997 births
Living people
People from Września
Sportspeople from Greater Poland Voivodeship
Polish men's volleyball players
Universiade medalists in volleyball
Universiade silver medalists for Poland
Medalists at the 2019 Summer Universiade
Projekt Warsaw players
Cuprum Lubin players
AZS Olsztyn players
Warta Zawiercie players
Skra Bełchatów players
Liberos